The 2022 New Zealand Derby was a Group I horse race which took place at Ellerslie Racecourse on Saturday 5 March 2022. It was the 147th running of the New Zealand Derby, and it was won by Asterix.

Asterix became the second consecutive winner of the New Zealand Derby for his trainers, the Matamata-based partnership of Lance O'Sullivan and Andrew Scott. He was also the second Derby winner in the green and red colours of the Kelt family, who also owned the 1993 winner Popsy. Former international cricketer Mark Greatbatch also shares in the ownership.

Asterix was bred by Sir Owen Glenn's Go Bloodstock, and he was bought for NZ$450,000 at the 2020 New Zealand Bloodstock Ready to Run Sale by bloodstock agent Bruce Perry.

Asterix made his debut less than two months before his Derby triumph, finishing sixth in a 1400-metre race at Matamata on January 12. An eighth placing followed at Te Rapa on February 2, before Asterix stepped up to 2100 metres and recorded a maiden victory at Tauranga on February 16.

The Derby was a massive step up in class for the emerging stayer, who was sent out as one of the outsiders of the field at 45-to-one. Pre-race attention was dominated by the high-class filly La Crique, who had scored runaway victories in the Desert Gold Stakes and Avondale Guineas in her two previous starts.

But after biding his time at the back of the field, Asterix and Johnathan Parkes began to creep forward out wide as the field made their way down the side of the track. Asterix swooped around the extreme outside at the home turn and challenged for the lead at the top of the straight, bounding clear with less than 200 metres to run.

La Crique was in an awkward position at the turn and took a crucial few seconds to work her way into the clear, by which time Asterix was well out of reach, winning by a length and a half.

The race time, 2:27.24, was the equal fourth-fastest time in the history of the New Zealand Derby.

Race details
 Sponsor: Vodafone New Zealand
 Prize money: NZ$1,000,000
 Track: Dead
 Number of runners: 12
 Winner's time: 2:27.24

Full result

Winner's details
Further details of the winner, Asterix:

 Foaled: 10 November 2018
 Sire: Tavistock; Dam: Mourasana (Shirocco)
 Owner: D & B Kelt, A & L Scott & Mark Greatbatch
 Trainer: Lance O'Sullivan & Andrew Scott
 Breeder: Go Bloodstock New Zealand Ltd
 Starts: 4
 Wins: 2
 Seconds: 0
 Thirds: 0
 Earnings: $607,200

The road to the Derby
Early-season appearances prior to running in the 2021 Derby.

 La Crique – 3rd Trevor & Corallie Eagle Memorial, 1st Desert Gold Stakes, 1st Avondale Guineas
 Regal Lion - 5th Waikato Guineas, 7th Avondale Guineas
 Soldier Boy - 1st Wanganui Guineas, 6th Hawke's Bay Guineas, 9th Sarten Memorial, 4th Wellington Stakes, 8th Waikato Guineas
 Nest Egg - 5th Wanganui Guineas, 10th Hawke's Bay Guineas, 9th Avondale Guineas
 White Noise - 1st Wellington Stakes, 6th Auckland Guineas, 1st Gingernuts Salver, 4th Avondale Guineas
 Montre Moi - 11th Trevor Eagle Memorial, 3rd Karaka Million 3YO Classic, 4th Waikato Guineas
 Arjay's Flight - 3rd Gingernuts Salver, 4th Waikato Guineas, 2nd Avondale Guineas
 Marchand - 8th Sarten Memorial, 3rd Uncle Remus Stakes, 3rd Avondale Guineas

Subsequent Group 1 wins
Subsequent wins at Group 1 level by runners in the 2022 New Zealand Derby.

 La Crique - 2022 Arrowfield Stud Plate
 Pinarello – 2022 Queensland Derby

See also
 2021 New Zealand Derby
 2020 New Zealand Derby
 2019 New Zealand Derby
 2018 New Zealand Derby
 2017 New Zealand Derby
 2016 New Zealand Derby
 2015 New Zealand Derby
 2014 New Zealand Derby
 2013 New Zealand Derby
 2012 New Zealand Derby
 2011 New Zealand Derby
 2010 New Zealand Derby
 Recent winners of major NZ 3 year old races

References

2022
2022 in New Zealand sport
March 2022 sports events in New Zealand
2022 in horse racing